Ragland House may refer to:

 Ragland House (Little Rock, Arkansas), listed on the National Register of Historic Places (NRHP) in Arkansas
Bailey-Ragland House, Paris, TX, listed on the NRHP in Texas
 Ragland House (Paris, Texas), listed on the NRHP in Texas

See also
John B. Ragland Mercantile Company Building, Kingsville, Texas, NRHP-listed 
R. A. Ragland Building, Sweetwater, Texas, NRHP-listed